Samuel Wright (born 15 July 1990) is an Australian front office official at The Australian Ballet.  Previously, he was an Australian rules footballer who played for the North Melbourne Football Club in the Australian Football League (AFL).

AFL career
Wright was drafted by North Melbourne with the 27th overall selection of the 2008 AFL Draft from the Murray Bushrangers. He made his debut on 16 May 2009 against Geelong, and received a Rising Star nomination in round 21, 2010.

Wright's career was disrupted in 2016 and 2017 by a series of sesamoid bone fractures in his foot and ankle, and two ruptured ligaments, requiring five ankle surgeries. Wright turned to ballet for physical therapy, guided by Sue Mayes, the principal physiotherapist with The Australian Ballet.

On 3 October 2018, Wright signed a contract for his eleventh season with North Melbourne.

Following another ankle injury, Wright announced his retirement on 30 July 2019.  Wright joined The Australian Ballet as the Dancer Welfare & Development Coordinator.

References

External links

1990 births
Living people
North Melbourne Football Club players
Australian rules footballers from Victoria (Australia)
Murray Bushrangers players
Werribee Football Club players